Cirocha is a right tributary of the river Laborec in the Prešov Region of eastern Slovakia. Its average flow is 2.85 m³/s in Snina.

Course
The headwaters of the Cirocha are in the Bukovské vrchy mountains under the Ruské sedlo saddle at the Slovak-Polish border. It flows south and west after first few kilometres into the Starina reservoir, flowing further to the municipalities of Snina and Stakčín. From Stakčín it flows to the west, to its confluence with the Laborec river near Humenné.

See also
 List of rivers of Slovakia

References

External links

Rivers of Slovakia
Geography of Prešov Region